A Golden Rose is a gold ornament blessed by popes of the Catholic Church.

Golden Rose may also refer to:

 Golden Rose Award, an American literary prize
 Golden Rose Bulgarian Feature Film Festival
 Golden Rose Stakes, an Australian horse race 
 Golden Rose Stakes (Great Britain), a British horse race
 Golden Rose Synagogue (Lviv), in Ukraine
 Golden Rose Synagogue (Dnipro), in Ukraine
 "The Golden Rose", a song by Tom Petty from the 2006 album Highway Companion

See also
 Rose d'Or, an international awards festival in entertainment broadcasting and programming